Ben Gastauer (born 14 November 1987) is a Luxembourgish former professional road cyclist, who rode professionally for the  between 2010 and 2021.

He took three professional victories during his career: the Luxembourgish National Time Trial Championships in 2012, and the general classification and a stage at the 2015 Tour du Haut Var. He was part of the  squad that won the team classification and delivered Jean-Christophe Péraud to the podium at the 2014 Tour de France, and part of those which assisted Romain Bardet to podium finishes at the 2016 Tour de France and the 2017 Tour de France. In August 2021 the  announced that Gastauer would retire from competition at the end of the season due to a problem with his pelvic floor, finishing his career at the 2021 Tour de Luxembourg the following month.

Major results
Source: 

2005
 1st  Time trial, National Junior Road Championships
 2nd Classique des Alpes
 10th Overall Grand Prix Rüebliland
2006
 1st  Road race, National Under-23 Road Championships
2007
 1st  Road race, National Under-23 Road Championships
 5th Overall Grand Prix du Portugal
2008
 1st  Time trial, National Under-23 Road Championships
 1st Ruota d'Oro
 9th Overall Flèche du Sud
2009
 National Under-23 Road Championships
1st  Road race
1st  Time trial
 1st  Overall Tour des Pays de Savoie
1st Points classification
1st Stage 1
 2nd Overall Flèche du Sud
 9th Giro del Mendrisiotto
2010
 3rd Road race, National Road Championships
 6th Overall Paris–Corrèze
2012
 National Road Championships
1st  Time trial
2nd Road race
2013
 3rd Time trial, National Road Championships
2014
 National Road Championships
2nd Road race
4th Time trial
2015
 1st  Overall Tour du Haut Var
1st Stage 1
 National Road Championships
2nd Road race
4th Time trial
2016
 1st  Mountains classification, Tour du Haut Var
 4th Road race, National Road Championships
2017
 National Road Championships
3rd Road race
4th Time trial
2019
 4th Time trial, National Road Championships

Grand Tour general classification results timeline

References

External links

 
 
 
 Ben Gastauer profile at Ag2r-La Mondiale

1987 births
Living people
Luxembourgian male cyclists
People from Dudelange